Mohammed Mubarak Hamood Mubarak Al-Ghafri (born 17 May 1997) is an Omani football player who plays for the Omani national team.

He debuted internationally on 5 September 2019 at the 2022 FIFA World Cup qualifying match against India in a 1-2 victory.

On 15 June 2021, Al-Ghafri scored his first goal for Oman against Bangladesh in a World Cup qualifying match in a 0-3 victory.

References

1997 births
Living people
Omani footballers
Oman international footballers
Association football midfielders